Tami Zawistowski is an American politician from the state of Connecticut. She is a member of the Republican Party representing the 61st district. On April 11, 2014, she won a special election to the Connecticut House of Representatives, succeeding Elaine O'Brien, who died in office.

References

External links

Living people
Year of birth missing (living people)
21st-century American politicians
Republican Party members of the Connecticut House of Representatives